The Mercantile Library Company of Philadelphia was established in 1821. Staff included John Edmands.

In 1989, the Free Library of Philadelphia absorbed the collections of the Mercantile Library.

See also
List of libraries in 19th century Philadelphia

References

External links

 William Ellery Channing. An address, delivered before the Mercantile Library Company of Philadelphia, May 11, 1841
 Bookplate of the Mercantile Library Company, via Flickr
 Illustration of the library in Frank Leslie's Illustrated Newspaper,  1869 (via US Library of Congress)

Libraries in Philadelphia
History of Philadelphia
Buildings and structures demolished in 1925
Demolished buildings and structures in Philadelphia
1821 establishments in Pennsylvania
1989 disestablishments in Pennsylvania